The Inter Baku 2010–11 season was Inter Baku's tenth Azerbaijan Premier League season, and their second season under manager Kakhaber Tskhadadze. Inter Baku were reigning champions of the Azerbaijan Premier League, but failed to defend their title finishing 5th and missing out on European qualification. Inter also participated in the Azerbaijan Cup, where they lost in the Final to Khazar Lankaran on penalties, and the UEFA Champions League where they were knocked out on penalties in the Second Qualifying Round by Lech Poznań of Poland.

Squad

Transfers

Summer

In:

 

Out:

Winter

In:

Out:

Competitions

Azerbaijan Premier League

First round

Results

Table

Championship group

Results

Table

Azerbaijan Cup

UEFA Champions League

Second qualifying round

Notes
Note 3: Played in Baku at Tofik Bakhramov Stadium as Inter Baku's Shafa Stadium did not meet UEFA criteria.

CIS Cup

Group A

Knockout stages

Final

Squad statistics

Appearances and goals

|-
|colspan="14"|Players who appeared for Inter Baku who left on loan during the season:

|-
|colspan="14"|Players who appeared for Inter Baku who left during the season:

|}

Goal scorers

Disciplinary record

References

External links 
 Inter Baku at Soccerway.com

Shamakhi FK seasons
Inter Baku